Keanu Kole Baccus (born 7 June 1998) is a South African-Australian professional soccer player who plays as a attacking midfielder for Scottish Premiership club St Mirren. Born in South Africa, he is an international with the Australia national team, where he made his full international debut in September 2022.

Early life
Baccus was born in Durban, South Africa but moved to Australia before his first birthday where his family settled in western Sydney. Baccus attended Kings Langley Public School where he was inspired by Socceroo Mark Schwarzer  to participate in the sport. He is the younger brother of Macarthur FC player Kearyn Baccus.

Club career

Western Sydney Wanderers
After rising from the Wanderers Academy to serve as co-captain of the youth team, Baccus signed a two-year senior contract in May 2017.

St Mirren
In April 2022, St. Mirren boss Stephen Robinson announced that Baccus was joining the Scottish Premiership club following the conclusion of the 2022 A League campaign. A few months later, the signing was confirmed by the club as a two-year deal.

International career
Baccus qualified for the Tokyo 2020 Olympics as part of the Australia under-23 team. The team beat Argentina in their first group match but were unable to win another match. They were therefore not in medal contention.

In September 2022, Baccus debuted for the senior team as a second-half substitute in a friendly against New Zealand. On 8 November 2022, Baccus was named in Australia's World Cup squad for the 2022 FIFA World Cup in Qatar. Baccus was used as a substitute in Australia's first three games in the tournament, before making his first senior international start in Australia's loss in the round of sixteen to Argentina.

Honours 
Australia U20
 AFF U-19 Youth Championship: 2016

References

External links

1998 births
Living people
Soccer players from Durban
Soccer players from Sydney
Australian soccer players
Australia under-23 international soccer players
Australia under-20 international soccer players
South African soccer players
South African emigrants to Australia
Australian people of South African descent
Association football midfielders
Western Sydney Wanderers FC players
A-League Men players
National Premier Leagues players
Footballers at the 2020 Summer Olympics
Olympic soccer players of Australia
Scottish Professional Football League players
St Mirren F.C. players
Australian expatriate soccer players
Australian expatriate sportspeople in Scotland
South African expatriate soccer players
Expatriate footballers in Scotland
Australia international soccer players
2022 FIFA World Cup players